This is a list of active, dormant and extinct volcanoes in South Africa.

Worcester[ Western Cape] | type : mountain | aux cord 
35”47 | S| O

References

South Africa

Volcanoes